Stotts Creek is a stream in Morgan County, Indiana, in the United States.

Stotts Creek was named for James Stotts, a pioneer who settled there in 1819.

See also
List of rivers of Indiana

References

Rivers of Morgan County, Indiana
Rivers of Indiana